Cendiuna is a genus of longhorn beetles of the subfamily Lamiinae, containing the following species:

 Cendiuna auauna Galileo & Martins, 1998
 Cendiuna cendira Galileo & Martins, 1991
 Cendiuna pataiuna Galileo & Martins, 1991
 Cendiuna planipennis (Bates, 1881)
 Cendiuna puranga Galileo & Martins, 1991

References

Hemilophini